The Leinster Cricket Union, also known as Cricket Leinster, is one of five provincial governing bodies for cricket in Ireland. Along with the Northern, Munster, Connacht Cricket Union and North West unions, it makes up the Irish Cricket Union (now known as Cricket Ireland), the supreme governing body of Irish cricket.

The Leinster jurisdiction covers counties the traditional Irish province of Leinster in the Republic of Ireland. In 2005, there were 40 clubs fielding 97 teams affiliated to the union. There are currently 41 clubs affiliated to the Union.

The Union was founded in 1890 as the "Leinster Branch of the Irish Cricket Union". Initially, there was strong resistance to competitive cricket and the Leinster Senior League and Leinster Senior Cup did not start until 1919, although junior clubs competed for the Intermediate Cup from 1895 and a schools league began in 1906.

Interprovincial team
In 2013, Cricket Ireland formed the three-day Interprovincial Championship, featuring teams from Leinster, the NCU and the North West. The Leinster team is known as Leinster Lightning.

References

External links
Cricket Leinster
Leinster Lightning official website

Irish provincial cricket unions
Cric
 
Sports organizations established in 1890
1890 establishments in Ireland